The Lucha Libre World Cup was a two-day professional wrestling event and tournament  organized by Mexican professional wrestling promotion Lucha Libre AAA Worldwide (AAA) with the financial backing of the Grupo Modelo brewery, with Victoria Beer as the official sponsor. The tournament included a number of three-man tag teams, referred to as trios in Lucha Libre, teams and wrestling promotions already announced are AAA, Total Nonstop Action Wrestling (TNA), Lucha Underground and Pro Wrestling Noah among others. The tournament was announced as "Lucha Libre Victoria World Cup".

Production

Background
The Mexican lucha libre promotion Lucha Libre AAA Worldwide (AAA), with the financial support of the Mexican brewing company Grupo Modelo organized the first ever Lucha Libre World Cup over the summer of 2015. The tournament itself was a one-night eight-team tournament for trios, or tag teams of three wrestlers. AAA reached out to several promotions both in Mexico and around the world and arranged for six of the eight teams to come from outside of AAA. Japanese wrestling promotions All Japan Pro Wrestling (AJPW) and Pro Wrestling Noah. Both Total Nonstop Action and Ring of Honor, based in the United States, also sent representatives to the tournament, in each case bolstered by representatives of Lucha Underground, an AAA joint-venture project based on Los Angeles. The tournament took place on May 25, 2015, and had the AAA labelled "Dream Team" of Rey Mysterio Jr., El Patrón Alberto and Myzteziz win the tournament, defeating Team TNA/Lucha Underground (Matt Hardy, Mr. Anderson and Johnny Mundo) in the finals.

Storylines
The event featured various professional wrestling matches with different wrestlers involved in pre-existing scripted feuds, plots and storylines. Wrestlers were portrayed as either heels (referred to as rudos in Mexico, those that portray the "bad guys") or faces (técnicos in Mexico, the "good guy" characters) as they followed a series of tension-building events, which culminated in a wrestling match or series of matches.

Wrestlers and promotions from around the world, Pro Wrestling Noah, Total Nonstop Action Wrestling (TNA), Lucha Underground, Pro Wrestling Wave and Oz Academy, were announced as being involved. The inclusion of Wave and Oz Academy meant that female wrestlers were going to be included too as they are all-female wrestling promotions. On April 22, 2016, AAA made their first official press release confirming the 2016 version of the Lucha Libre World Cup. The statement confirmed that there would be two qualifying matches for the Cup during the April 29 show in Xalapa, Veracruz, but did not reveal a date for the tournament nor any other participants. The first qualifier was a three-way match between Perros del Mal ("The Bad Dogs") teammates Joe Líder, Daga and Pentagón Jr., with the winner becoming part of a team representing AAA. The other qualifier was announced as current AAA Mega Champion El Texano Jr. wrestling against Taurus and Garza Jr. Of all the announced participants only Texano Jr. had participated in the previous year's Lucha Libre World Cup. The third qualifying match for Team AAA took place during the May 14 show in Orizaba, Veracruz and it was originally a three-way match between Nicho el Millonario, Ricky Marvin and El Hijo del Pirata Morgan but later due to a request from Psycho Clown he was added to the match and eventually won.

Tournament rules 
AAA vice president Dorian Roldán explained the rules in a video uploaded to AAA's official YouTube channel last year. The tournament would consist of trios matches structured in quarterfinals, semi-finals and a final, plus an extra match to determine the third place. The bouts are slated to have a 15-minute time limit. If the time limit is reached without a clear winner, each of the participating teams selects one member, and the two picked wrestlers face off in a 5-minute sudden death in which the winning wrestler gets the victory for his team. There will be as many sudden deaths as necessary to determine a victor.

Teams
Men's Division

Women's Division

Tournament bracket 
Men's Division

Women's Division

References

External links 
 Official Facebook page
 Official Website

2016 in professional wrestling
2016
2016 in Mexico
Events in Mexico City
June 2016 events in Mexico
Pro Wrestling Noah shows
Pro Wrestling Zero1
Lucha Underground shows
Impact Wrestling shows